The 2002–03 Magyar Kupa (English: Hungarian Cup) was the 63rd season of Hungary's annual knock-out cup football competition.

Quarter-finals
Games were played on March 4 and 5, 2003.

|}

Semi-finals
Games were played on April 15 and 16, 2003.

|}

Final

See also
 2002–03 Nemzeti Bajnokság I
 2002–03 Nemzeti Bajnokság II

References

External links
 Official site 
 soccerway.com

2002–03 in Hungarian football
2002–03 domestic association football cups
2002-03